Haydarlı (literally "lion's place" or "hero's place") is a Turkic word that may refer to:

Places

Armenia
 Haydarli, Lori, a town in the Lori Province

Turkey
 Haydarlı, Dinar, a village in the district of Dinar, Afyonkarahisar Province
 Haydarlı, Gölbaşı, a village in the district of Gölbaşı, Adıyaman Province
 Haydarlı, Horasan
 Haydarlı, Koçarlı, a village in the district of Koçarlı, Aydın Province
 Haydarlı, Nazilli, a village in the district of Nazilli, Aydın Province
 Haydarlı, Şereflikoçhisar, a village in the district of Şereflikoçhisar, Ankara Province

See also
 Haydar, root of the word